The term programming domain is mostly used when referring to domain-specific programming languages. It refers to a set of programming languages or programming environments that were written specifically for a particular domain, where domain means a broad subject for end users such as accounting or  finance, or a category of program usage such as artificial intelligence or email. Languages and systems within a single programming domain would have functions common to the domain and may omit functions that are irrelevant to a domain.

Some examples of programming domains are:

Expert systems, computer systems that emulate the decision-making ability of a human expert and are designed to solve complex problems by reasoning through bodies of knowledge.
Natural-language processing, handling interactions between computers and human (natural) languages such as speech recognition, natural-language understanding, and natural-language generation. 
Computer vision, dealing with how computers can understand and automate tasks that the human visual system can do and extracting data from the real world.

Other programming domains would include:
Application scripting
Array programming
Artificial-intelligence reasoning
Cloud computing
Computational statistics
Contact Management Software
E-commerce
Financial time-series analysis
General-purpose applications
Image processing
Internet
Numerical mathematics
Programming education
Relational database querying
Software prototyping
Symbolic mathematics
Systems design and implementation
Text processing
Theorem proving
Video game programming and development
Video processing

See also
Domain (software engineering)
Domain-specific language

References

Akour, Mohammed & Falah, Bouchaib. (2016). Application domain and programming language readability yardsticks. 1-6. 10.1109/CSIT.2016.7549476.

Domain